Ernst Wandaller (born 4 October 1934) is an Austrian wrestler. He competed in the men's Greco-Roman welterweight at the 1956 Summer Olympics.

References

External links
 

1934 births
Living people
Austrian male sport wrestlers
Olympic wrestlers of Austria
Wrestlers at the 1956 Summer Olympics
Place of birth missing (living people)